Zale (Romanian for "chainmail") is a hip hop group from Bucharest, Romania.

Raku began listening to hip hop, practicing and MCing in 1993–1994. His first live appearance was in Berceni, Bucharest, and his first discography appearance in 1997; after leaving Morometzii, he became a member of the R.A.C.L.A. crew. In 2000 and 2001 he was invited by the band Paraziţii to record songs with them. In 2003 Raku was invited by Cheloo from Paraziţii to perform on his solo album, Sindromul Tourette.  In 2004 the video "Egali din naştere" (Born Equal) signed Ombladon (Paraziţii) and featuring Raku was a big success at the MTV Europe Music Awards.  In 2004 raku and Ombladon won the Best Romanian Act Award in Rome.

Discography

Studio albums
Chei Verbale (2005)
Respect (2007)
Locos (2019)

See also
 Romanian hip hop

External links
 Official website
YT channel Official YT channel

Romanian hip hop groups
Musical groups from Bucharest